A Temporary Vagabond is a 1920 British silent comedy film directed by Henry Edwards and starring Edwards, Chrissie White and Stephen Ewart.

Cast
 Henry Edwards - Dick Derelict
 Chrissie White - Peggie Hurst
 Stephen Ewart - James Hurst
 Gwynne Herbert - Emma
 Douglas Munro - Mike
 John MacAndrews - Davis

References

External links

1920 films
British silent feature films
1920 comedy films
Films directed by Henry Edwards
British comedy films
British black-and-white films
Hepworth Pictures films
1920s English-language films
1920s British films
Silent comedy films